This is a list of nominated candidates for the Bloc Québécois in the 2015 Canadian federal election.

Candidate statistics

Quebec - 78 seats

See also
Results of the Canadian federal election, 2015
Results by riding for the Canadian federal election, 2015

References

External links
 Bloc Québécois website
 Elections Canada – List of Confirmed Candidates for the 41st General Election

 
 

fr:Candidats du Bloc québécois à l'élection fédérale canadienne de 2015